Mortal Danger by Eileen Wilks is the 4th novel in the World of the Lupi series. It was released on November 1, 2005.

It was nominated for the 2005 Romantic Times Best Werewolf Romance Novel.

Plot summary
Former homicide cop Lily Yu has a lot on her plate. There's her sister's wedding, a missing magical staff with unknown powers, and her grandmother's sudden decision to visit the old country just when Lily could use a little advice. Maybe she should turn to the man she's involved with, but for all the passion that flares between them, she doesn't really know Rule Turner. Yet she's tied to him for life, both of them caught in an unbreakable mate bond.

That Rule is a werewolf, prince of his people, only complicates matters.

Now an agent in a special unit of the FBI's Magical Crimes Division, Lily's job is to hunt down Harlowe, a charismatic cult leader bent on bringing an ancient evil into the world. But what Lily doesn't realize is that Harlowe has set a trap-for her. And then the unthinkable happens.

In the blink of any eye Lily's world divides and collides, and she is thrust into a new and frightening reality. Her only hope will be to trust Rule-and herself-or Lily will be lost forever...

Main characters
Lily Yu - a Chinese American sensitive who works for the Magical Crimes Division of the FBI
Rule Turner - the Nokolai Heir (or prince as the press like to dub him). His werewolf clan is located in San Diego, CA.
Cynna Weaver - a Finder whose image decorates the cover of Blood Lines. The tattoos are how Cynna works her special brand of magic.
Cullen Seabourne - a recent adoption to Rule's Nokolai werewolf clan. Cullen was clanless for many years. He is also a sorcerer, which is a slightly illegal pastime according to the federal authorities. Eileen describes him as sin incarnate to look at.

External links
Eileen Wilks Official website

World of the Lupi books
2005 American novels

Novels by Eileen Wilks